The Union of Sankarist Parties was a Sankarist political alliance in Burkina Faso.

In the 2007 parliamentary elections the party won two of the 111 seats in the National Assembly.

See also 

 Union for Rebirth / Sankarist Party

Defunct political party alliances in Burkina Faso
Sankarist political parties in Burkina Faso